Ursi Walliser (born 17 February 1975) is a Swiss skeleton racer who competed in the late 1990s and early 2000s. She is best known for her best overall seasonal finish of second in the women's Skeleton World Cup championship in 1998–99.

References
List of women's skeleton World Cup champions since 1997.
Skeletonsport.com profile

1975 births
Living people
Swiss female skeleton racers
20th-century Swiss women
21st-century Swiss women